Trearddur Bay Lifeboat Station is located in Trearddur, Anglesey, Wales and opened in 1967 as an inshore lifeboat station.

The station currently operates both an  lifeboat and a  lifeboat.

History
A lifeboat station was established in Trearddur in 1967 as an inshore lifeboat station, and a  lifeboat was placed on station, with her first rescue taking place on 4 June, and a new boathouse was constructed in 1971.

A new and larger boathouse was built in 1993, which provided changing room facilities, crew room and galley, a workshop, fuel store and storeroom and a souvenir outlet, which allowed a new  lifeboat to be placed on station on 5 December 1996, with the D-class being withdrawn.

On 24 May 2001, the station's Honorary Secretary Mr Jack Abbott MBE was awarded the Royal Humane Society Testimonial Vellum and a Resuscitation Certificate for his rescue of a man who got into difficulties trying to return to the shore after swimming after his dinghy which had drifted away from the slipway. Abbott spotted the man face down, 50m from shore and swam out to him, towed him back to shore and performed CPR.

The same year, a decision was made by the RNLI to reallocate a D-class lifeboat to Trearddur Bay to operate alongside the B-class lifeboat already on station.

On 24 February 2011, Prince William and his fiancée Catherine Middleton were present at the station to officially name the new  lifeboat Hereford Endeavour.

Fleet

D-class

B-class

Station Honours
The following RNLI medals and other awards have been presented to crew members from Trearddur Bay Lifeboat Station:
2 x Framed Letters of Thanks
 (1999) A Framed Letter of Thanks was awarded to Helmsman Alan Hughes for his actions during a search for a child who had fallen into the sea at Rhoscolyn.
 (2006) A Framed Letter of Thanks was awarded to Helmsman Terry Penlebury for his part in saving the lives of two divers.

1 x Thanks of the Institution Inscribed on Vellum
 (2002) The Thanks of the Institution Inscribed on Vellum was awarded to Helmsman Christopher Pritchard for the rescue of three people from a capsized speedboat on 8 September 2001

2 x Bronze medals
(1971) Bronze Medals were awarded to John Burns and Edmund Williams for rescuing two people that were clinging to a capsized dinghy near Cod Rocks.

References

External links
RNLI page on Trearddur Bay Lifeboat Station

Lifeboat stations in Wales
1967 establishments in Wales
Trearddur
Transport in Gwynedd
Transport infrastructure completed in 1967